The Proteus effect describes a phenomenon in which the behavior of an individual, within virtual worlds, is changed by the characteristics of their avatar. This change is due to the individual's knowledge about the behaviors that other users who are part of that virtual environment typically associate with those characteristics. Like the adjective protean (meaning versatile or mutable), the concept's name is an allusion to the shape changing abilities of the Greek god Proteus. The Proteus effect was first introduced by researchers Nick Yee and Jeremy Bailenson at Stanford University in June 2007. It is considered an area of research concerned with the examination of the behavioral effects of changing a user's embodied avatar.

Overview
The Proteus effect proposes that the visual characteristics and traits of an avatar are associated with specific behavioral stereotypes and expectations. When an individual believes that others will expect certain behaviors from them because of their avatars' appearance, they will engage in those expected behaviors. Support for the Proteus effect comes from past research in real world scenarios that has shown how certain physical characteristics, like attractiveness and height, are often associated with more positive social and professional outcomes. Moreover, experimental manipulations of these characteristics in virtual environments have shown that individuals engage in stereotype-confirming behaviors.

This is part of a larger field of research that looks at the behavior of individuals who engage in computer-mediated communication (CMC). Although CMC comes in many forms (text, audio, video, etc.), the Proteus effect is particularly relevant to CMC in which individuals interact by using avatars. This effect is driven by the increased ability to control one's appearance in an online virtual environment. Virtual world environments allow users to control many aspects of their appearance that they cannot easily change in the real world (e.g., height, weight, facial features).

Theoretical background
Three psychological concepts that led to the development of the Proteus effect are behavioral confirmation, self-perception theory, and deindividuation, although since then further explanatory approaches and influencing factors such as priming and feedback loops through communication have been identified or proposed.

Behavioral confirmation
Behavioral confirmation refers to the effects that a perceiver's actions can have on the resulting behavior of an individual. Specifically, this concept proposes that interacting with individuals who hold preexisting stereotypes will lead the target of those stereotypes to engage in behaviors that will confirm the perceiver's expectations. The Proteus effect differs from behavioral confirmation in that it does not consider the actions of a perceiver. Instead, its goal is to explain how the individual's own stereotypes and expectations drives the change in behavior, independent of any social interactions that take place.

Self-perception theory
Self-perception theory states that individuals determine their attitudes and emotions by making observations about both their own behavior and the circumstances that led to those behaviors. It was first introduced as an alternative to cognitive dissonance, which argued that changes in behavior can result from an individual's attempt to eliminate tension from contradicting behaviors and beliefs. A series of studies on self-perception theory that looked at changes in behavior as a result of wearing black, a color associated with negative concepts like death and evil, were influential in the development of the Proteus effect. In these studies by Mark G. Frank and Thomas Gilovich, participants who watched video recordings of sports rated NFL and NHL players wore black uniforms as being more aggressive. Furthermore, participants who were instructed to wear black jerseys reported greater preferences for engaging in aggressive behaviors against competitors. The argument across these studies was that how participants perceived themselves (i.e., wearing a color that has negative associations) led them to adopt negative behaviors. The Proteus effect carries this idea into virtual environments, where individuals see themselves as their avatar which in turn shapes their behavior.

Deindividuation
Deindividuation refers to a decrease in self-awareness and self-evaluation as a result of being part of a group. Individuals who experience deindividuation seem to be influenced to a greater degree by identity cues. In a 1979 study by Robert D. Johnson and Leslie L. Downing, participants were instructed to give an electric shock to research assistants while wearing either a KKK disguise or a nurse's uniform. The results showed that the costumes worn by participants affected the shock level that they administered to the research assistants. Johnson and Downing stated that these findings supported the argument that deindividuation increases the influence that identity cues have on individuals. In virtual environments, deindividuation is believed to be driven by the level of anonymity that this type of setting provides for its users.

Evidence
A meta-analysis examining 46 quantitative experimental studies of the Proteus effect found a small-but-approaching-medium effect size that was relatively consistent (between 0.22 and 0.26), with nearly all variance explained, suggesting that the Proteus effect is reliable and sizable relative to other digital media effects.

Findings from a study that compared the appearance and behaviors of avatars in Second Life to the real world behavior and appearance of their users support the Proteus effect. In this study, participants who reported that they had designed their avatars to be more attractive also reported engaging in more confident and extraverted behavior when compared to their real world behavior. A study also found that the effects happen in the short term.

The Proteus effect has also been linked to attitude changes that reflect the stereotypes associated with their avatar's appearance. In a study by Jesse Fox, Jeremy N. Bailenson, and Liz Tricase, women were assigned avatars whose appearances were either highly sexualized or non-sexualized. While wearing a head-mounted display, participants were asked to face a virtual mirror that allowed them to see the reflection of their avatar. This was followed by a virtual conversation with a male avatar who was being controlled by the researchers. Women who used a sexualized avatar reported having more thoughts about their body image. The researchers concluded that this finding supports the Proteus effect by demonstrating that individuals internalized the sexualized aspects of their avatar's appearance, which led to greater self-objectification. Support for this conclusion comes from a similar study in which more body-related thoughts were reported by women who were asked to wear swimsuit when compared to women who were only asked to try on a shirt while facing a mirror. There are also studies that suggest how the use of avatars decrease stereotypes about elderly groups.

Further support for the Proteus effect comes from a series of studies that used avatars to increase the amount of exercise performed by individuals. Across three studies, the results consistently showed that participants were more likely to increase their level of physical activity after observing an avatar engage in those behaviors and be rewarded for them. One major difference in this study is that the effects that avatars had on participants' behavior depended on how much the avatar resembled the user. This difference was tested by assigning some users avatars that had been created using photographs of their actual faces.

The Proteus effect has also been used to explain successful replications of the work by Frank and Gilovich (1988) and Johnson and Downing (1979). The results of two studies by Jorge Peña, Jeffrey T. Hancock, and Nicholas A. Merola found that attitude towards aggressive behavior in a virtual setting was increased in individuals who used avatars wearing black cloaks or clothing that resembled KKK uniforms. The researchers argued that the negative associations related to the avatar's appearance changed the user's attitudes. Additionally, the researchers suggested that priming, in addition to self-perception theory, could explain the Proteus effect.

See also
 Self-fulfilling prophecy
 Social identity model of deindividuation effects
 Virtual Human Interaction Lab

References

Further reading
 Begley, Sharon. "Our Imaginary, Hotter Selves". Newsweek. 25 February 2008.
 Dell, Kristina. "How Second Life Affects Real Life". Time. 12 May 2008. 
 Carey, Benedict. "Standing in someone else's shoes, almost for real". The New York Times. 2 November 2008.
 Fisher, Christopher. "Immersive Virtual Environment Creates Behavior Change In The Physical World". The Behavioral Medicine Report. 8 April 2011.
 Grohol, John. "The Proteus Effect: How Our Avatar Changes Online Behavior". PsychCentral. 24 November 2009.
 Klotz, Irene. "Avatars May Inspire Us to Exercise". DiscoveryNews. 29 March 2010.
 "Research shows avatars can negatively affect users". PhysOrg. 10 November 2009.
 Thornton, Terri. "Our Avatars, Ourselves". PBS. 6 September 2011.
 Zweig, Jason. Meet Future You.' Like What You See?" The Wall Street Journal. 26 March 2011.

Psychological effects
Virtual avatars